Sarsenapati Hambirrao (Marathi: सरसेनापती हंबीरराव) is an Indian Marathi-language historical war film written and directed by Pravin Tarde and produced by Sandeep Mohite Patil, Saujanya Nikam and Darmendra Bora under banner of Urvita Productions. The film stars Pravin Tarde, Gashmeer Mahajani, Mohan Joshi in lead roles. The film is based on life of Military Commander of Maratha Empire Hambirrao Mohite. The film released worldwide on 27 May 2022.

Cast 

 Pravin Tarde as Sarsenapati Hambirrao
 Gashmeer Mahajani as Chhatrapati Shivaji Maharaj and Chhatrapati Sambhaji Maharaj
 Shruti Marathe as Maharani Soyarabai
 Raqesh Bapat as Sarjhah Khan
 Mohan Joshi as Aurangzeb
 Snehal Tarde as Hambirrao's wife 
 Upendra Limaye as Bahirji Naik
 Ramesh Pardeshi as Yesaji Kank
 Sunil Abhyankar as Annaji Pant
 Arya Ramesh Pardesi as Tararani
 Rewati Limaye as Yesubai Bhonsale

Premise 
The biographical film is based and portrays the story of Hambirrao Mohite who was the chief military commander of the Maratha Empire. Hambirrao was an able military general, he executed several campaigns for Chattrapati Shivaji/Shivaji Maharaj and later served under Chattrapati Shambhaji/Shambhaji Maharaj.

Reception

Box office 
Sarsenapati Hambirao collected ₹ 2.06 crores on the first day.  The film registered an increase in collections on Sunday, earning ₹3.31 crore.  The film earned ₹8.71 crore in its three-day opening weekend.  11 days collection is 18.20 crores

Critical reception 
Mihir Bhanage of The Times of India gave the film 3 out of five stars, saying "Gashmeer Mahajani and Praveen Tarde star on screen in this landmark film".

Awards and nominations

1st Fakt Marathi Cine Sanman 
Won

 Best Playback Singer Male – Anand Shinde – "Saat Daudale"

Nominated

 Best Film –  Urvita Productions

 Best Actor in a Lead Role –  Pravin Tarde 

 Best Actor in a Supporting Role –  Gashmeer Mahajani 

 Best Cinematographer –  Mahesh Limaye

References

External links 

2022 films
2020s Marathi-language films
Cultural depictions of Shivaji
Films set in the Maratha Empire
Indian historical drama films
2020s Indian films
2022 drama films